Rywaczki  is a village in the administrative district of Gmina Miedźno, within Kłobuck County, Silesian Voivodeship, in southern Poland.

The village has a population of 103.

References

Rywaczki